"Tears Are Falling" is a song by the American band Kiss. It was the lead single from the group's 1985 studio album Asylum.

Background
The track was written and sung by vocalist/guitarist Paul Stanley. It is one of Kiss' few songs since the 1970s to have been solely created by him. It would also be Stanley's last individual composition until "Loving You Without You Now" on his 2006 solo album Live to Win.

Reception
Cash Box said it has "a distinctive chorus hook and a pop arrangement."

Music video
A video to promote the single was filmed in London in September 1985, and was directed by David Mallet. It was one of three videos produced in promotion of the 'Asylum' album, along with 'Uh! All Night' and 'Who Wants to Be Lonely'. Despite the low production values of the 'Tears Are Falling' video, it was heavily played on MTV's Dial MTV phone video-request show for several months, until a new ruling stated that the requested videos had to be only a few weeks old to qualify.

Chart performance
The song enjoyed minor success when it was released as a single in the United States and United Kingdom. It peaked at number 20 on Billboard's Hot Mainstream Rock Tracks and 51 on the Billboard Hot 100, meanwhile peaking at 57 in the UK Singles Chart.

Personnel
 Paul Stanley - lead and backing vocals, rhythm guitar, bass guitar
 Bruce Kulick - lead guitar, backing vocals
 Eric Carr - drums, backing vocals
 Allan Schwartzberg - additional stereo drum overdubs

Charts

References

1985 singles
Kiss (band) songs
Songs written by Paul Stanley
1985 songs
Mercury Records singles
Music videos directed by David Mallet (director)